Paromoionchis tumidus is a species of small, air-breathing sea slug, a shell-less marine pulmonate gastropod mollusc in the family Onchidiidae.

Distribution 
Paromoionchis tumidus is widely distributed in the Indo-Pacific from Japan in the north, to Hong Kong, Vietnam, the Philippines, Brunei Darussalam, Singapore, Peninsular Malaysia, the Andaman Islands, Indonesia, and Australia (New South Wales, Northern Territory, Queensland).

Synonymized names 

The following names have been synonymized with Paromoionchis tumidus:

 Onchidium samarense Semper, 1880
 Onchidium mertoni Simroth, 1918
 Onchidium hongkongense Britton, 1984

References

External links 

 Video of Paromoionchis tumidus in its natural environment on YouTube (under the synonymized name Onchidium hongkongense).

Onchidiidae
Gastropods described in 1880